The women's long jump at the 2014 IPC Athletics European Championships was held at the Swansea University Stadium from 18–23 August.

Medalists

See also
List of IPC world records in athletics

References

long jump
2014 in women's athletics
Long jump at the World Para Athletics European Championships